

Karl Weisenberger (29 September 1890 – 28 March 1952) was a German general during World War II.  He was a recipient of the Knight's Cross of the Iron Cross of Nazi Germany.

Awards

 Knight's Cross of the Iron Cross on 29 June 1940 as Generalleutnant and commander of 71. Infanterie-Division
 Grand Cross, with swords, of the Order of the Lion of Finland on 12 August 1944

References
Citations

Bibliography

 
 

1890 births
1952 deaths
Generals of Infantry (Wehrmacht)
Military personnel from Würzburg
German Army personnel of World War I
German Army generals of World War II
Recipients of the clasp to the Iron Cross, 1st class
Recipients of the Gold German Cross
Recipients of the Knight's Cross of the Iron Cross
Recipients of the Order of the Cross of Liberty, 1st Class
People from the Kingdom of Bavaria
Reichswehr personnel